Qariyeh-ye Shavardi (also Romanized as Qarīyeh-ye Shāverdī) is a village in Naseri Rural District, Khanafereh District, Shadegan County, Khuzestan Province, Iran. At the 2006 census, its population was 266, in 36 families.

References 

Populated places in Shadegan County